MX is a Brazilian thrash metal band formed in São Paulo in the early 1980s. Its name comes from the American ICBM MX missile. Mx was one of the most important bands from the Brazilian thrash metal scene during the late 1980s. The band's sound is closer to the Bay Area thrash scene than the Brazilian scene, although many of the vocals were death metal grunts. However, some of its later work was fitting as post-thrash.

MX was the opening act in Brazil for Testament in 1989 and Exodus in 1997.

The band released two studio albums during its heyday, Simoniacal in 1988 and Mental Slavery in 1990, on the defunct label Fucker.

Shortly after the release of Mental Slavery, the band split up, but reformed in 1997, releasing the EP Again in that year and the album Last File in 1999. The band split up again shortly after.

The band reformed for a second time in 2005, and released two new studio albums. Their first two albums have been re-released under the Marquee Records label.

Band members

Current lineup 
Alexandre Prado Favoretto "Morto" – vocals, bass guitar 
Décio Frignani – guitars 
Alexandre da Cunha – drums, vocals 
Alexandre Gonsalves "Dumbo" – vocals, guitar

Former band members 
Beraldo – vocals 
Chico Comelli – bass guitar 
Eduardo – bass guitar 
Yuri Konopinsk – bass guitar 
Alexandre G. - bass guitar 
C.M. - guitars

Discography

Studio albums 
 Simoniacal – 1988
 Mental Slavery – 1990
 Last File – 1999
 Re-Lapse – 2014
 A Circus Called Brazil – 2018

EPs 
 Again – 1997

Other appearances and releases 
 Headthrashers Live – 1987 (live compilation)

External links 
 MX at Encyclopedia Metallum

Brazilian thrash metal musical groups
Musical groups established in 1983
Brazilian musical trios
Musical groups disestablished in 1991
Musical groups reestablished in 1997
Musical groups disestablished in 2000
Musical groups established in 2005
1983 establishments in Brazil
1991 disestablishments in Brazil
1997 establishments in Brazil
2000 disestablishments in Brazil
2005 establishments in Brazil